Gorjiabad (also Romanized as Gorjīābād) is a village in Feyziyeh Rural District, in the Central District of Babol County, Mazandaran Province, Iran. At the 2006 census, its population was 2,069, in 518 families.

References 

Populated places in Babol County